Zafar Sobhan is a Bangladeshi attorney, editor and political commentator. He is editor of the Dhaka Tribune. He is also a former football player.

Family and education
Sobhan was born on 19 May 1970 in Dhaka, his parents are Rehman Sobhan, an economist, and Salma Sobhan, a lawyer. His father is one of South Asia's leading economists and founder of the Centre for Policy Dialogue. His mother was the first barrister in East and West Pakistan, as well as the founder of the Centre for Law and Mediation. His uncle Farooq Sobhan is Bangladesh's former foreign secretary and headed the Bangladesh Enterprise Institute. Sobhan studied at Pomona College, the University of British Columbia and Pepperdine University.

His wife is a painter, his son is a YouTuber.

Career
Sobhan worked as a corporate attorney in the United States. He is a member of the New York State Bar. He also worked as a public school teacher.

Sobhan is the founding editor of the Dhaka Tribune. He was previously the op-ed editor of The Daily Star and the head of Forum magazine from 2004 to 2010. He has been a columnist with The Guardian, The Sunday Guardian, Time and Outlook. In 2005, he was named by the World Economic Forum as a Young Global Leader and was a Yale World Fellow in 2009.

References

Bangladeshi journalists
University of British Columbia alumni
Pomona College alumni
Pepperdine University alumni
Yale University alumni
Living people
Bangladeshi newspaper editors
20th-century Bengalis
21st-century Bengalis
1970 births
Suhrawardy family
Members of the Dhaka Nawab family
Urdu-speaking Bangladeshi